Iphigénie en Tauride (English: Iphigeneia in Tauris) is an opera by the French composers Henri Desmarets and André Campra. It takes the form of a tragédie en musique in a prologue and five acts. The libretto is by Joseph-François Duché de Vancy with additions by Antoine Danchet. Desmarets had begun work on the opera around 1696 but abandoned it when he was forced to go into exile in 1699. Campra and his regular librettist Danchet took up the piece and wrote the prologue, most of Act Five, two arias in Act One, an aria for Acts Two and Three, and two arias for the fourth act. The plot is ultimately based on Euripides' tragedy Iphigeneia in Tauris.

Performance history

Iphigénie was first performed by the Académie royale de musique at the Théâtre du Palais-Royal in Paris on 6 May 1704 with Françoise Journet as Iphigénie and Gabriel-Vincent Thévenard as  Oreste. It was coolly received at first, but enjoyed several revivals in the 18th century, the last being in 1762.

Roles

References
Notes

Sources
 Original libretto: Iphigénie en Tauride, Tragédie, Représentée pour la prémiere fois par l'Academie Royale de Musique, Le Mardi sixiéme jour de May 1704, Paris, Ballard, 1704 (accessible  for free online at Gallica, Bibliothèque Nationale de France)
 1711 printed score: Iphigénie en Tauride , tragedie mise en musique par Messieurs Desmarets, & Campra ; représentée pour la premiere fois par l'Academie royale de musique, le mardy sixiéme jour de may 1704. Remise au théatre le douziéme mars 1711, Paris, Ballard, 1711 (accessible for free online at Gallica, Bibliothèque Nationale de France)
The Viking Opera Guide ed. Holden (Viking, 1993)
Le magazine de l'opéra baroque, page: Iphigénie en Tauride, accessed 2 November 2009

Tragédies en musique
Operas by multiple composers
Operas by André Campra
Operas by Henri Desmarets
French-language operas
Operas
Opera world premieres at the Paris Opera
1704 operas
Operas based on classical mythology
Operas based on Iphigenia in Tauris